Gosiewski (feminine Gosiewska) is a Polish surname. Notable people include:

 Aleksander Korwin Gosiewski, Polish nobleman and military commander
 Beata Gosiewska, Polish politician
 Bogusław Korwin Gosiewski, Bishop of Smoleńsk
 Jack Gosiewski, Australian rugby footballer
 Jerzy Gosiewski, Polish politician
 Krzysztof Korwin Gosiewski, Polish nobleman and politician
 Małgorzata Gosiewska, Polish politician
 Przemysław Gosiewski, Polish politician
 Tadeusz Gosiewski, Polish lawyer and diplomat
 Teresa Korwin Gosiewska, Polish noblewoman
 Wincenty Korwin Gosiewski, Polish nobleman and general
 Zygmunt Gosiewski, Polish boxer

The Gosiewski are also two aristocratic families of Poland:

 Gosiewski (Korwin) family of Korwin coat of arms originating from a Knight of the clan Korwin, Lord of Gosiewo (Gosie or Gosie Leśnica), near Zambrów
 Gosiewski (Ślepowron) family of Ślepowron coat of arms originating from a Knight of the clan Ślepowron, Lord of Gosie or Gosiewo, near Różan

Polish-language surnames